Scanners II: The New Order is a 1991 Canadian science fiction thriller film. It is a sequel to the 1981 feature film Scanners with a different cast, starring David Hewlett, Deborah Raffin, Raoul Trujillo, and Yvan Ponton.  It was written by B. J. Nelson and directed by Christian Duguay. The plot involves a crooked police commissioner (Ponton) who schemes to gain control of a major city by manipulating Scanners (persons born with telepathic and telekinetic abilities) to do his bidding. The film was released direct-to-video.

Plot
During one of his classes, a young veterinarian intern named David Kellum discovers that he can read and control minds of others. When he moves from his country home to the city to continue his studies, he finds difficulty in controlling himself: the congestion of many minds and the ability to hear voices overwhelm him.

He stumbles across a store robbery and kills the gunman by causing his head to explode with his mind. Police Commander John Forrester watches the store's security tape. He tells David that he is a Scanner, and there are others like him around the world. He asks for David's help in tracking down elusive criminals. David agrees.

After capturing a man who put strychnine in milk containers throughout the city, Forrester introduces David to Peter Drak, another Scanner who works for him. Drak is more aggressive with his powers. Forrester teaches David techniques by using Drak as a test subject. Drak considers David an enemy but is injected with Eph2, a variant of Ephemerol, the drug that originally created Scanners. It calms him down before he can harm David. Forrester tells David that although Eph2 calms a Scanner's mind, it is addictive and he should never use it. Forrester encourages him to develop and control his mental abilities on his own.

David feels he has accomplished something by helping with law enforcement. His feeling changes when Forrester orders him to control the mayor and have her announce Forrester as the next chief of police. Forrester reassures him that this will enable them to stop all crimes. David, feeling guilty, disagrees and questions Forrester's agenda. He explains to the mayor how he forced her to appoint Forrester and apologizes. They plan to remove Forrester from office. David tells Forrester that he is quitting, so Forrester has Drak attack David and kill the mayor before she can react. David escapes and hides at his parents' home.

He asks his parents about his abilities, and they tell him that he was adopted. They explain that his birth parents were Cameron Vale and Kim Obrist (from the first film Scanners). Vale and Obrist told them about his abilities and that he was in danger. David goes for a walk. While he is gone, Drak and his accomplices kill David's mother and leave David's father for dead. When David returns, his father tells him about his older sister, Julie Vale. He leaves his father with paramedics and begins searching for his sister.

He finds Julie in a secluded cabin. She confirms who she is and explains that their parents were killed by Forrester for resisting him. She also states that her former boyfriend Walter agreed to test the earlier version of Ephemerol and was one of the first Scanners to use the drug, a more unstable version. Walter was kidnapped by Forrester and never seen again. Julie agrees to help David.

Together they go to Forrester's secret compound and discover that Walter is alive and is one of the test subjects with addiction to Eph2. Julie and David disable the perimeter guards. Once inside, Julie is tranquilized. David leaves her behind to destroy the research and free the test subject Scanners. Drak attacks David in the test subject quarters, but is stopped by a combined attack by all test subjects, which drains away Drak's life force. This reverses the physical damage all addicted Scanners were suffering from, as well as David's injuries from Drak's attack.

Forrester arrives on the scene. Television news reporters and camera crews also show up. He denies the existence of Scanners and his connection to the mayor's death. With his power, David forces Forrester to admit his involvement and motivation before cameras. Afterward, Forrester grabs a shotgun and tries to shoot David, but David and Julie deform Forrester's head and face with their telekinesis. David then announces to the cameras that Scanners mean no harm and wish to live in peace.

Cast
 David Hewlett as David Kellum
 Deborah Raffin as Julie Vale
 Yvan Ponton as Commander John Forrester
 Isabelle Mejias as Alice Leonardo
 Raoul Trujillo as Peter Drak
 Tom Butler as Doctor Morse
 Vlasta Vrána as Lt. Guy Gelson
 Dorothée Berryman as Mayor Lanzoni
 Murray Westgate as George Kellum
 Doris Petrie as Susan Kellum
 Emily Eby as Reporter
 Jason Cavalier as Convenience Store Thug

Production
The film was shot in Montreal in December of 1989.

Release
The film was released on VHS by 20th Century Fox Home Entertainment and Media Home Entertainment in the U.S. and in Canada by Malofilm Home Video. A DVD version of the film is included in the Scanners Trilogy box set released only in Europe by Starz Home Entertainment. Shout! Factory's new horror label Scream Factory released a Region 1 DVD/Blu-ray edition on September 10, 2013.

Reception
In a review of the Scanners II / Scanners III double feature combo pack, Creative Loafing commented that the original Scanners was one of David Cronenberg's weaker films and that the sequels failed to effectively build on its premise. Citing "a weak script, poor acting and middling effects", the reviewer gave it one and a half stars.

References

External links
 
 
 

Films directed by Christian Duguay (director)
1991 horror films
1990s science fiction action films
1991 direct-to-video films
Canadian action horror films
Canadian direct-to-video films
Canadian science fiction action films
English-language Canadian films
1990s English-language films
Canadian independent films
Films shot in Montreal
Fiction about mind control
Scanners (film series)
1990s science fiction horror films
Films about telekinesis
Canadian science fiction horror films
1991 directorial debut films
Canadian sequel films
1991 independent films
1991 films
1990s Canadian films